The 1st Special Forces Command (Airborne) is a division-level special operations forces command within the United States Army Special Operations Command. The command was first established in 1989 and reorganized in 2014 grouping together the Army Special Forces (a.k.a. "the Green Berets"), psychological operations, civil affairs, and support troops into a single organization operating out of its headquarters at Fort Bragg, North Carolina.

Mission
The mission of 1SFC (A) is to organize, equip, train, and validate forces to conduct full-spectrum special operations in support of United States Special Operations Command (USSOCOM), Geographic Combatant Commanders, American ambassadors, and other governmental agencies.  The new command includes all seven Special Forces groups (including the five active duty and two Army National Guard groups), two Psychological Operations groups, a civil affairs brigade, and a sustainment brigade. The Command has the ability to rapidly deploy a high-level headquarters to run sustained, unconventional campaigns in foreign theaters.

1st Special Forces Regiment
All seven Special Forces Groups were redesignated as part of the 1st Special Forces Regiment, and as such, were made part of its historical lineage, with all the campaign credits and battle honors that go with it. The Regiment is ceremonial, not operational.

See also
 United States Special Operations Command
 Joint Special Operations Command
 United States Army Special Operations Command
 United States Marine Corps Forces Special Operations Command
 United States Naval Special Warfare Command
 Air Force Special Operations Command
 Army Special Operations Brigade - the equivalent to the command within the British Armed Forces

References

External links

 USASFC Archived

United States Army Special Operations Command
Military units and formations established in 2014
2014 establishments in the United States